Emil Hațieganu (December 9, 1878—May 13, 1959) was a Romanian politician and jurist, a prominent member of the Romanian National Party (PNR) and of its successor, the National Peasants' Party (PNȚ); he was physician Iuliu Hațieganu's brother. Before his arrest, he was an honorary member of the Romanian Academy.

He attended gymnasium and high school in Blaj and Cluj, and then studied Law at Franz Joseph University in Cluj, graduating in 1901. Afterwards, he practiced Law and was a judge in Huedin, Ileanda, and Cluj. 

Hațieganu later became a professor at the University of Cluj, and served as its rector in 1929–1930. Following World War I and the Aster Revolution in Hungary, he was present with PNR leaders at the Alba Iulia assembly that called for the union of Transylvania with Romania, and served on the Directory Council designated by the participants.

A Minister of Labour and Social Security in the Iuliu Maniu cabinets in Bucharest, he was kept in the Gheorghe Mironescu government (that brought about the return of Carol II as King of Romania). Hațieganu also held the office of Minister of State for Transylvania. In 1940, he became noted for his vocal protest against the cession of Northern Transylvania to Hungary (the signing of the Second Vienna Award).

Retreated from political life during World War II, he returned to the forefront of illegal opposition before the fall of the Ion Antonescu pro-Nazi dictatorship (see Romania during World War II). After the start of Soviet military occupation in Romania, Hațieganu held the position of PNȚ Minister without Portfolio in the first Petru Groza Romanian Communist Party-dominated cabinet; his appointment, like that of the National Liberal , followed pressures on Groza to open executive structures to politicians from outside the Communist-led National Democratic Front alliance — both mandates were ended by the 1946 general election.

In front of mounting Communist influence, Hațieganu approached Iuliu Maniu with a proposal to establish direct contacts with the Western Allies by having Ion Mihalache evade the country (July 1947); the attempt, known as the Tămădău Affair, eventually led to the prosecution of the PNȚ leadership during a show trial and to an official ban on all party activities.

Arrested in Sibiu by the authorities of Communist Romania, he was investigated by the notorious Securitate officer . Hațieganu was prosecuted and sentenced on November 6, 1948 to three years in prison for "PNȚ activism" and "sabotage". He was incarcerated at Cluj, Sighet, Jilava, Văcărești, and Ocnele Mari. In 1951, the term of his imprisonment in the infamous Sighet Prison was increased by another 60 months. He was released on June 15, 1955, and died in Cluj four years later.

Notes

References

 (Insights into the events following the Second Vienna Award.)

1878 births
1959 deaths
People from Cluj County
Franz Joseph University alumni
Delegates of the Great National Assembly of Alba Iulia
Academic staff of Babeș-Bolyai University
Rectors of Babeș-Bolyai University
National Peasants' Party politicians
20th-century Romanian politicians
Honorary members of the Romanian Academy
Romanian Austro-Hungarians
Romanian Greek-Catholics
Romanian jurists
Romanian people of World War II
Romanian Ministers of Health
Romanian Ministers of Labor
Inmates of Sighet prison
Romanian prisoners and detainees